Bailey Road (also known as Nehru Path) is a road and neighbourhood in Patna, India. It connects Patna with Danapur. It roughly starts from Income Tax Golambar and ends in Danapur, running through the heart of the city. It is one of the most important roads in the city. Many important landmarks like Patna High Court, Patna Women's College, Patna Secretariat, Patna Zoo, Patna Airport, Bihar Museum etc. are situated beside or near to this road. Bailey Road was officially renamed as Jawahar Lal Nehru Marg, but this road is still widely known as Bailey Road. Now, this road has been renamed as Nehru Path by the government of Bihar. This area is served by Shastrinagar Police Station of Patna Police.

History
Under the British Raj, Patna gradually started to attain its lost glory and emerged as an important and strategic centre of learning and trade in India. When the Bengal Presidency was partitioned in 1912 to carve out a separate province, Patna was made the capital of the new province of Bihar and Orissa. The city limits were stretched westwards to accommodate the administrative base, and the township of Bankipore took shape along the Bailey Road (originally spelt as Bayley Road, after the first Lt. Governor of Bihar and Orissa, Sir Steuart Colvin Bayley). This area was called the New Capital Area.

Landmarks
 Patna Planetarium
 Income tax Office
 Mount Carmel High School, Patna
 J.D. Women's College, Patna
 Patna Women's College
 Eco Park
 Bihar Public Service Commission Office
 Patna Zoo
 Sardar Patel Bhavan, Bihar Police headquarter
 Patna Golf Club
 Kendriya Vidyalaya, Bailey Road
 IGIMS
 Paras Healthcare
 Delhi Public School, Patna (Junior wing)
 Bihar Museum
Patna High Court
Patliputra Junction

Gallery

References

Neighbourhoods in Patna